The Prince Edward Islands are two small uninhabited islands in the sub-Antarctic Indian Ocean that are part of South Africa. The islands are named Marion Island (named after Marc-Joseph Marion du Fresne, 1724–1772) and Prince Edward Island (named after Prince Edward, Duke of Kent and Strathearn, 1767–1820).

The islands in the group have been declared Special Nature Reserves under the South African Environmental Management: Protected Areas Act, No. 57 of 2003, and activities on the islands are therefore restricted to research and conservation management. Further protection was granted when the area was declared a marine protected area in 2013. The only human inhabitants of the islands are the staff of a meteorological and biological research station run by the South African National Antarctic Programme on Marion Island.

History

The islands were discovered on 4 March 1663 by Barent Barentszoon Lam of the Dutch East India Company ship Maerseveen and were named Dina (Prince Edward) and Maerseveen (Marion), but the islands were erroneously recorded to be at 41° South, and neither were found again by subsequent Dutch sailors. In January 1772, the French frigate Le Mascarin, captained by Marc-Joseph Marion du Fresne, visited the islands and spent five days trying to land, thinking they had found Antarctica (then not yet proven to exist). Marion named the islands Terre de l'Espérance (Marion) and Ile de la Caverne (Pr. Edward). After failing to land, Le Mascarin continued eastward, discovering the Crozet Islands and landing at New Zealand, where Marion du Fresne and some of his crew were killed and eaten by Māori natives. 

Julien Crozet, navigator and second in command of Le Mascarin, survived the disaster, and happened to meet James Cook at Cape Town in 1776, at the onset of Cook's third voyage. Crozet shared the charts of his ill-fated expedition, and as Cook sailed from Cape Town, he passed the islands on 13 December, but was unable to attempt a landing due to bad weather. Cook named the islands after Prince Edward, the fourth son of King George III; and though he is also often credited with naming the larger island Marion, after Captain Marion, this name was adopted by sealers and whalers who later hunted the area, to distinguish the two islands.

The first recorded landing on the islands was in 1799 by a group of French seal hunters of the Sally. Another landing in late 1803 by a group of seal hunters led by American captain Henry Fanning of the Catharine found signs of earlier human occupation. The islands were frequented by sealers until about 1810, when the local fur seal populations had been nearly eradicated. The first scientific expedition to the islands was led by James Clark Ross, who visited in 1840 during his exploration of the Antarctic, but was unable to land. Ross sailed along the islands on 21 April 1840. He made observations on vast numbers of penguins ("groups of many thousands each"), and other kinds of sea-birds. He also saw fur seals, which he supposed to be of the species Arctocephalus falklandicus. The islands were finally surveyed during the Challenger Expedition, led by Captain George Nares, in 1873.

The sealing era lasted from 1799 to 1913. During that period visits by 103 vessels are recorded, seven of which ended in shipwreck. Sealing relics include iron trypots, the ruins of huts and inscriptions. The occasional modern sealing vessel visited from Cape Town, South Africa, in the 1920s.

The islands have been the location of other shipwrecks. In June 1849 the brig Richard Dart, with a troop of Royal Engineers under Lt. James Liddell, was wrecked on Prince Edward Island; only 10 of the 63 on board survived to be rescued by elephant seal hunters from Cape Town. In 1908 the Norwegian vessel Solglimt was shipwrecked on Marion Island, and survivors established a short-lived village at the north coast, before being rescued. The wreck of the Solglimt is the best-known in the islands, and is accessible to divers.

On 22 September 1979, a US surveillance satellite known as Vela 6911 noted an unidentified double flash of light, known as the Vela incident, in the waters off the islands. There was and continues to be considerable controversy over whether this event was perhaps an undeclared nuclear test carried out by South Africa and Israel or some other event. The cause of the flash remains officially unknown, and some information about the event remains classified. Today, most independent researchers believe that the 1979 flash was caused by a nuclear explosion.

In 2003, the South African government declared the Prince Edward Islands a Special Nature Reserve, and in 2013 declared  of ocean waters around the islands a Marine Protection Area, thus creating one of the world's largest environmental protection areas.

Marion Research Station 
In 1908, the British government assumed ownership of the islands. In late 1947 and early 1948, South Africa, with Britain's agreement, annexed the islands and installed the meteorological station on Transvaal Cove on the north-east coast of Marion Island. The research station was soon enlarged and today studies regional meteorology and the biology of the islands, in particular the birds (penguins, petrels, albatrosses, gulls) and seals.

A new research base was built from 2001 to 2011 to replace older buildings on the site. The access to the station is either by boat or helicopter. A helipad and storage hangar is located behind the main base structure.

In April 2017, the South African National Antarctic Programme launched a new astrophysical experiment on Marion Island called Probing Radio Intensity at high-Z from Marion (PRIZM), searching for signatures of the hydrogen line in the early universe.

Geography and geology 
At 46 degrees latitude, its distance to the equator is only slightly longer than to the South Pole. The topography of Marion Island includes many hillocks and small lakes, and boggy lowland terrain with little vegetation.

The terrain is generally rocky, with high cliffs on its south western side.

Both islands are of volcanic origin. The volcano is active, with eruptions having occurred between 1980 and 2004.

Climate 
Despite being located inside the south temperate zone at 46 degrees latitude, the islands have a tundra climate. They lie directly in the path of eastward-moving depressions all year round and this gives them an unusually cool and windy climate. Strong regional winds, known as the roaring forties, blow almost every day of the year, and the prevailing wind direction is north-westerly. In spite of its very chilly climate it is located closer to the equator than mild northern hemisphere climates such as Paris and Seattle and only one degree farther south than fellow southern hemisphere climates such as Comodoro Rivadavia in Argentina and Alexandra in New Zealand. Many climates on lower latitudes in the Northern hemisphere have far colder winters than Prince Edward Islands due to the islands' maritime moderation, even though temperatures in summer are much cooler than those normally found in maritime climates.

The islands are among the cloudiest places in the world; about 1300 hours a year of sunshine occur on the sheltered eastern side of Marion Island, but only around 800 hours occur away from the coast on the wet western sides of Marion and Prince Edward Islands.

Summer and winter have fairly similar climates with cold winds and threat of snow or frost at any time of the year.

Flora and fauna 

The islands are part of the Southern Indian Ocean Islands tundra ecoregion that includes a small number of subantarctic islands. Because of the paucity of land masses in the Southern Ocean, the islands host a wide variety of species and are critical to conservation. In the cold subantarctic climate, plants are mainly limited to grasses, mosses, and kelp, while lichens are the most visible fungi. The main indigenous animals are insects along with large populations of seabirds, seals and penguins.

Birds

The islands have been designated an Important Bird Area (IBA) by BirdLife International for their significant seabird breeding populations. At least thirty different species of birds are thought to breed on the islands, and it is estimated the islands support upwards of 5 million breeding seabirds, and 8 million seabirds total. Five species of albatross (of which all are either threatened or endangered) are known to breed on the islands, including the wandering albatross, dark-mantled, light-mantled, Indian yellow-nosed and grey-headed albatross. 

The islands also host fourteen species of petrel, four species of prion, the Antarctic tern, and the brown skua, among other seabirds. Four penguin species are found: king penguins, Eastern rockhoppers, gentoos and macaroni penguins.

Mammals
Three species of seal breed on the islands: the southern elephant seal, the Antarctic fur seal, and the Subantarctic fur seal. The waters surrounding the islands are often frequented by several species of whale, especially orcas, which prey on penguins and seals. Large whales such as southern rights and southern humpbacks, and leopard seals are seen more sporadically, and it remains unclear how large or stable their current local populations are, though it is thought their numbers are significantly down compared to the time of first human contact with the islands. The area saw heavy sealing and whaling operations in the nineteenth century and continued to be subject to mass illegal whaling until the 1970s, with the Soviet Union and Japan allegedly continuing whaling operations into the 1990s. Currently, the greatest ecological threat is the longline fishing of Patagonian toothfish, which endangers a number of seabirds that dive into the water after baited hooks.

Invasive species 
The wildlife is particularly vulnerable to introduced species and the historical problem has been with cats and mice. House mice arrived to Marion Island with whaling and sealing ships in the 1800s and quickly multiplied, so much so that in 1949, five domestic cats were brought to the research base to deal with them. The cats multiplied quickly, and by 1977 there were approximately 3,400 cats on the island, feeding on burrowing petrels in addition to mice, and taking an estimated 455,000 petrels a year. Some species of petrels soon disappeared from Marion Island, and a cat eradication programme was established. A few cats were intentionally infected with the highly specific feline panleukopenia virus, which reduced the cat population to about 600 by 1982. The remaining cats were killed by nocturnal shooting, and in 1991 only eight cats were trapped in a 12-month period.

It is believed that no cats remain on Marion Island today, and with the cats gone, the mouse population has sharply increased to "plague like" levels. In 2003, ornithologists discovered that in the absence of other food sources, the mice were attacking albatross chicks and eating them alive as they sat helplessly on their nests. A similar problem has been observed on Gough Island, where a mouse eradication programme is currently planned to begin in 2019, with the island expected to be mouse free by 2021. A programme to eradicate invasive rats on South Georgia Island was completed in 2015, and as of 2016 the island appears to be completely rat free. The geography of Marion Island presents certain obstacles not found on either Gough or South Georgia islands, particularly its large size, high elevations and variable weather. An assessment of the island was completed in May 2015, led by noted invasive species ecologist John Parkes, with the general conclusion that an eradication programme is feasible, but will require precise planning.

Both Gough Island and the Prince Edward Islands also suffer from invasive procumbent pearlwort (Sagina procumbens), which is transforming the upland ecosystem and is now considered beyond control.

Legal status 

Marion Island and Prince Edward Island were claimed for South Africa on 29 December 1947 and 4 January 1948 respectively, by a South African Navy force from HMSAS Transvaal under the command of John Fairbairn. On 1 October 1948 the annexation was made official when Governor-General Gideon Brand van Zyl signed the Prince Edward Islands Act, 1948. In terms of the Act, the islands fall under the jurisdiction of the Cape Town Magistrate's Court, and South African law as applied in the Western Cape applies on them. The islands are also deemed to be situated within the electoral district containing the Port of Cape Town;  this is ward 115 of the City of Cape Town.

Amateur radio 

, Marion Island, prefix ZS8, was the third most wanted DXCC "entity" by the amateur radio community. By the end of 2014, it had dropped to 27th, after simultaneous activity by three licencees in the 2013/2014 team. However, their activity was mainly on voice. On Morse telegraphy, the Islands remain the second most wanted entity after North Korea, while on data they are sixth out of 340.

See also 
 Crozet Islands
 Gough Island
 List of Antarctic islands north of 60° S
 List of protected areas of South Africa
 List of sub-Antarctic islands
 Prince Edward Fracture Zone
 S. A. Agulhas
 S. A. Agulhas II
 SANAE
 South African National Antarctic Programme
 Vela incident

Citations

General and cited sources 
 
 
 
 
 
 de Bruyn P.J.N.; Oosthuizen W.C., eds. (2017). "Pain forms the Character: Doc Bester, Cat hunters & Sealers". Antarctic Legacy of South Africa. .

External links 

 South African Research station on Marion Island – official website
 Facebook Pages – Marion Island team publications
 Facebook Groups – Marion Island team discussions
 Marion Island seal and killer whale research – Official Marion Island Marine Mammal Programme website
 No Pathway Here – An account of the annexation of the islands
 Earth Observatory – Image of the Day 18 October 2009

 
1908 establishments in the British Empire
Archipelagoes of the Indian Ocean
Important Bird Areas of Indian Ocean islands
Important Bird Areas of South Africa
Important Bird Areas of subantarctic islands
Indian Ocean islands of South Africa
Integral overseas territories
Island restoration
Maritime history of South Africa
Penguin colonies
Polygenetic shield volcanoes
Ramsar sites in South Africa
Ridge volcanoes
Seabird colonies
Seal hunting
South African National Antarctic Programme
Subantarctic islands
Uninhabited islands of South Africa
Volcanic islands
Volcanoes of South Africa
Volcanoes of the Southern Ocean